The Right Honourable Lord Provost of Edinburgh is the convener of the City of Edinburgh local authority, who is elected by the city council and serves not only as the chair of that body, but as a figurehead for the entire city, ex officio the Lord-Lieutenant of Edinburgh. It is the equivalent in many ways to the institution of  Mayor that exists in many other countries.

While some of Scotland's local authorities elect a Provost, only the four main cities (Edinburgh, Glasgow, Aberdeen and Dundee) have a Lord Provost. In Edinburgh this position dates from 1667, when Charles II elevated the Provost to the status of Lord Provost, with the same rank and precedence as the Lord Mayor of London. The title of Lord Provost is enshrined in the Local Government etc. (Scotland) Act 1994.

Roles and Traditions

Prior to the Local Government (Scotland) Act 1973 the City of Edinburgh was run by a single-tier body called the Edinburgh Corporation, of which the Lord Provost was chair. Akin to the Corporation of the City of London, the body included council representatives from the Incorporated Trades of Edinburgh and the Merchant Company of Edinburgh. The corporations security was provided by the High Constables of Edinburgh, who also serve as the Provost's bodyguard. Although the 1973 Act changed the governance of the City, the Lord Provost retains a relationship with the Merchants Company and Incorporated Trades. The High Constables continue to serve as the Lord Provost's bodyguards. The Lord Provost is also by virtue of their office the Lord High Admiral of the Firth of Forth.

The Lord Provost chairs meetings of Edinburgh City Council at the Edinburgh City Chambers, originally opened in 1760 by Lord Provost George Drummond as a meeting place for Edinburgh merchants and known as the Edinburgh Royal Exchange. The Lord Provost takes part in a number of ceremonies and traditions, including The Edinburgh Ceremony of the Keys, the Kirking of the Deacons, The Riding of the Marches and the Edinburgh Hogmanay. The Lord Provost also coordinates Armed Forces Day parades with both the Royal Scots Dragoon Guards and The Royal Regiment of Scotland. 

 Whilst the Lord Provost technically has no official residence, Lauriston Castle - a property bequeathed to the Edinburgh Corporation and now under the ownership of Edinburgh City Council - has been used to host the Lord Provost's annual Garden Party. It was suggested in 2013 that Lauriston Castle be renovated and turned into an official residence for the Lord Provost, however the cost at the time was deemed too prohibitive.

Lord Provosts are entitled to two ceremonial Baillie's Lamps outside their home in the city (few chose this to be done). These are green and gold street lamps. These lamps remain in place for the duration of the Lord Provost's term in office. When they demit the office one was removed, while the other remains for the duration of the Lord Provost's life or occupancy of said building.

The Lord Provost's official car bears the licence plate S0. This licence plate was issued specially by the Ministry of Transport after the Edinburgh corporation missed out on acquiring Scotland’s first number plate, S1 at the turn of the 20th century. A number of other licence plates are owned by the council for other official vehicles, including S10 and SS10. In 2012 it was proposed that the licence plates could be sold to help raise funds for the city, however this plan does not appear to have gone ahead.

The High Constables of Edinburgh serve as the Lord Provost's ceremonial bodyguard and form the Lord Provost's Platoon at the Edinburgh Military Tattoo.

The Lord Provost also has a team of six bailies to support their work, appointed by Edinburgh City Council.

The Lord Provost has a reserved pew at Kirk of the Canongate. This is because historically the gift of the living lay with the bailies of Canongate, but when Canongate merged with Edinburgh in 1856, so too did this power.

Current and past Lord Provosts

The current Lord Provost is Cllr Robert Aldridge. He has served on the Council continuously since 1984, and was previously the Leader of the Liberal Democrat group. He was elected Lord Provost unanimously.

In total, there have been 258 Provosts and Lord Provosts.

References

Sources

Politics of Edinburgh
Edinburgh, Lord Provost of
Government of Scotland
 
 
Edinburgh-related lists